Studio 8 is an American entertainment company founded in 2014, by Jeff Robinov, John Graham, Mark Miner and based in Culver City. It specializes in film and television production.

Robinov, Gramham and Miner prior to Studio 8 worked in film and production, before leaving to eventually co-found the company. Starting off moderately in 2016 with  Billy Lynn's Long Halftime Walk, the following theatrical releases included Brett Sumner's West of the West, Albert Hughes' Alpha, and Yann Demange's White Boy Rick.

History

2014: Founding
Studio 8 was founded on 2012, by film veterans Jeff Robinov, John Graham, Mark Miner. Robinov is a former film executive at Warner Bros, Graham was the production EP of Paramount Pictures and Screen Gems director of development, and Miner was the EVP of story and creative at Paramount and studio analyst at Universal Pictures.

The company began in 2014 with funding Fosun Group and Sony Pictures Entertainment. The company marked its first theatrical release with Ang Lee's Billy Lynn's Long Halftime Walk. The following theatrical releases included Brett Sumner's West of the West, Albert Hughes' Alpha, and Yann Demange's White Boy Rick.

In December 2017, Fosun was rumored to sell its stake in Studio 8, but only after the performances of Alpha and White Boy Rick.

2018: Television and future projects
In January 2018, Studio 8 announced that it would start a television division led by Steve Mosko and Katherine Pope.  The first series is Hugh Howey's Beacon 23 with Zak Penn as writer and producer.

Studio 8 will produce Robert Eggers's medieval fantasy The Knight and remake of Nosferatu starring Anya Taylor-Joy. In December 2015, Studio 8 acquired Lee's Thrilla in Manila movie with Peter Morgan as writer and David Oyelowo possibly playing Joe Frazier. In April 2016, Studio 8 will co-produce Hughes' next movie The Fury of a Patient Man, along with The Picture Company. In July 2017, Studio 8 acquired the rights to the Daily Beast article "The Possibly-True Story of the Super-Burglar Trained to Rip Off al Qaeda," with George Mastras as screenwriter. In July 2018, Studio 8 acquired the movie rights to Rob Liefeld's Prophet, to produce films with Liefeld and Adrian Askarieh as producers.

Filmography

Released

Upcoming films

Television

See also

 STX Entertainment
 Neon
 Amazon Studios
 Annapurna Pictures
 Blumhouse Productions

References

External links

Film production companies of the United States